Talon, in comics, may refer to:

 Talon (Marvel Comics), a Marvel Comics character and member of the Guardians of the Galaxy of the Earth-691
 Talon (DC Comics), a DC Comics superhero and Earth-3 equivalent of Robin
 Talon, an assassin of the Court of Owls in DC Comics

It may also refer to:

Black Talon (comics), a number of Marvel Comics characters

See also
Talon (disambiguation)